GBN may refer to:

Media 
Global Broadcast News India
Gospel Broadcasting Network, US Christian satellite broadcaster
Global Buddhist Network, Thai digital television station
GB News, UK news channel
Grenada Broadcasting Network,

Other uses 
Go-Back-N ARQ, reliable data transfer protocol
Gebrüder Bing Nuremberg, German toy company
Glenbrook North High School
Global Benchmarking Network 
Gore Beyond Necropsy, a Japanese band